Body Cam is a 2020 American police procedural horror film directed by Malik Vitthal, from a screenplay by Nicholas McCarthy and Richmond Riedel and a story by Riedel. The film stars Mary J. Blige, Nat Wolff, David Zayas, David Warshofsky, Demetrius Grosse and Anika Noni Rose.

Originally scheduled for a May 2019 release date, Body Cam was pulled from the schedule and was released digitally on May 19, 2020, prior to a video on demand release on June 2, 2020, by Paramount Pictures.

Plot

In Swinton, Louisiana, police officer Kevin Ganning pulls over a green van for not having a license plate. Ganning demands the driver to leave their vehicle. When Ganning notices a bloody rag, he aggressively demands the driver to exit the vehicle. When Ganning points his gun at the driver, an unknown entity pulls him away.

12 hours earlier, Officer Renee Lomito-Smith is being cleared to return to active duty after an altercation with a civilian and is paired with rookie Danny Holledge. They get a call from dispatch where officer Ganning is "failing to respond." Officers Lomito-Smith and Holledge go to investigate Ganning's last known location. Lomito-Smith finds the dash-cam footage in the police car, where she witnesses Ganning's beating from an unknown entity. They soon find Ganning's lifeless body hanging and call it in. Sergeant Kesper tells them the footage has been destroyed, long before Lomito-Smith and Holledge had arrived.

Lomito-Smith soon gets a lead, when she recognizes the logo of a hospital from the driver's pants. She is then able to get the identity and home address of the driver; Taneesha Branz. She and Holledge arrive at Taneesha's home and discover it has been abandoned. While checking the home, they find a photo of Taneesha and her son. Holledge leaves quickly when he becomes too scared because of roaches. Officer Lomito-Smith is unable to find anything and leaves. As she goes to exit, she finds that it is locked and as she tries to get out, she realizes the entity is watching it. As it to Lomito-Smith intending to kill her, Renee breaks the window on the door. 

Lomito-Smith investigates Taneesha; she discovers her son Demarco was killed in a gang shoot out. Taneesha shops in a grocery’s store late at night where she is immediately harassed by two men in-store. Officers Roberts and Birke spot the green van, calling for backup. Lomito-Smith and Holledge answer the call for help and change their route to provide assistance to Roberts and Birke. Birke and Roberts enter the store and question the two men aggressively, despite neither man showing any hostility towards the officers. 

One of the men shoots and kills Birke as he takes Taneesha hostage. As he threatens to kill Taneesha, the entity suddenly lifts him into the air, freeing Taneesha. He fires his gun attempting to escape; accidentally killing the store clerk as well as his partner. Taneesha slips out through the back exit during the commotion. Roberts investigates the shooter's last location, only for his bloodied body to fall onto the floor from above. He attempts to warn Roberts the entity is behind him(as he cannot speak). The entity attempts to suffocate Roberts with a bag, and when the attempt falls, it lifts him into the air and kills him off-screen. The bloodied man dies from his injuries. 

Officers Lomito-Smith and Holledge arrive at the store, and find everyone dead. Lomito-Smith investigates in the rear parts of the store, finding no one. She discovers the security camera footage is unusable. When she goes back into the store, she finds the phone belonging to one of the men and steals it hoping to find a lead. After returning to the station, she visits the medical examiner to get details about the victims. The medical examiner explains how the body is damaged in the most unusual way but points out victims had their teeth knocked out. Lomito-Smith pleads with the medical examiner to give her five minutes alone with the bodies. He agrees; but tells her she cannot steal anything or disrupt the bodies. She pulls out the phone that she found at the store, unlocking it with the thumbprint of one of the two men. Later that evening, she reviews the video from the phone, noticing the entity behind Taneesha and the man holding her hostage.

Lomito-Smith gets a lead on the origin of the green van, where it was reported stolen. She heads to an unnamed church and questions the Pastor, deducing the van was never stolen. The Pastor explains Taneesha's son, Demarco, was deaf and avid volunteer to many organizations. When Lomito-Smith asks where Taneesha could be, the Pastor gives a possible location. She only finds articles of Demarco's death alongside photos of Officers Ganning, Roberts, Holledge, and Penda. Officer Lomito-Smith sees a camera watching her. She tries to call Sergeant Kesper, but he does not pick up. She then calls Holledge and says she needs to talk to him face-to-face. He agrees that she can come over in one hour. Renee goes to Danny's house and discovers he has committed suicide. The grief-stricken Rene finds a note left on the sink; "I'm Sorry, Danny" along with a flash drive.

Renee inserts the flash drive into her computer. It Holledge's body cam footage of himself and officers Ganning, Roberts, and Penda during a police stop. It shows where they are yelling at a young man to stop walking under the assumption he is a suspect. Panda shoots him when the young man refuses to stop. Roberts hands the cell phone to Penda and goes the young man's backpack. Penda realizes the young man was Demarco, Taneesha's deaf son. Officer Holledge  points out his teeth came out, but Penda tells Holledge how bad this situation. Penda suffocates Demarco.

Lomito-Smith calls Sergeant Kesper. She meets him at a warehouse and tells him what the four officers did to Demarco. Kesper pulls his gun on Renee and tells her the incident best left covered and it will do more harm than good. As she walks inside the building at gun point, Officer Penda emerges from his car and follows behind them. Penda demands Renee to hand over the footage. When she refuses, Penda shoots into her Kevlar vest. Taneesha appears and speaks to Panda "YOU KILLED MY SON, DEMARCO. YOU REMEMBER HIM? BECAUSE HE REMEMBERS YOU." 

The entity is revealed as Demarco's vengeful spirit, who beats up Sergeant Kesper and knocks his teeth out. Renee and Taneesha escape to another part of the warehouse, with Penda in persuit. Demarco's spirit finally takes his revenge; removing Panda's innards from his body and impaling him onto a large pipe. As Renee readies herself to confront Demarco, Taneesha reveals he will not harm her. Emergency services arrive to the scene. Renee and Taneesha see both of their sons together, signifying they have now found peace and can move on. Kesper, who survived Demarco's attack, is sent to prison.

Cast

 Mary J. Blige as Renee Lomito-Smith
 Nat Wolff as Danny Holledge
 David Zayas as Sergeant Kesper
 David Warshofsky as Dario Penda
 Demetrius Grosse as Gary Smith
 Anika Noni Rose as Taneesha Branz
 Lance E. Nichols as Pastor Thomas Jackson
 Lara Grice as Detective Susan Hayes
 Ian Casselberry as Kevin Ganning
 Philip Fornah as Gabe Roberts
 Naima Ramos-Chapman as Maria Birke
 Mason Mackie as DeMarco Branz
 Jibrail Nantambu as Christopher
 Sylvia Grace Crim as Pierce
 Jeff Pope as Jacob
 Lorrie Odom as Yolanda

Production
In March 2017, it was announced Richmond Riedel had written the script for the film. In March 2018, it was announced Malik Vitthal would direct the film, with Nicholas McCarthy re-writing the script, and Paramount Pictures distributing. John Ridley had performed script revisions prior to McCarthy's involvement.

In June 2018, Mary J. Blige joined the cast of the film. In July 2018, Nat Wolff joined the cast. In September 2018, Anika Noni Rose and David Zayas were cast, with filming beginning in New Orleans.

Joseph Bishara composed the film score. Paramount Music has released the soundtrack.

Release
Body Cam was supposed to be released on May 17, 2019 but was pushed back to December 6. On November 12, 2019, Paramount pulled the film from the schedule and it was released digitally on May 19, 2020, prior to a video on demand release on June 2, 2020.

It was the eighth-most rented film on Spectrum in its first weekend of release.

Critical response
The site's critics consensus reads: "Ambitious yet undercooked, Body Cam can't quite connect the dots between its genre thrills and socially aware themes." On Metacritic, the film has an weighted average score of 37 out of 100, based on reviews from 5 critics, indicating "generally unfavorable reviews".

References

External links
 

2020 films
2020 horror thriller films
2020s police procedural films
2020s supernatural horror films
American horror thriller films
American police films
American supernatural horror films
Crime horror films
Films about police corruption
Films about corruption in the United States
Films not released in theaters due to the COVID-19 pandemic
Films scored by Joseph Bishara
Films set in Louisiana
Films shot in New Orleans
Hood films
Paramount Pictures films
Paramount Players films
2020s English-language films
2020s American films